The Seventh Commandment (French: Le septième commandement) is a 1957 French comedy film directed by Raymond Bernard and starring Edwige Feuillère, Jacques Dumesnil and Jacques Morel. The title is a reference to the seventh of the Ten Commandments in the Roman Catholic tradition, "Thou shalt not steal". It was shot at the Neuilly Studios in Paris. The film's sets were designed by the art director Paul-Louis Boutié.

Synopsis
Princesse Nadia Vronskaïa is a veteran con artist, working with her two partners to targets likely suspects. However things go awry when she falls in love with her latest mark. With his help she turns the tables on her former associates.

Cast
 Edwige Feuillère as 	Princesse Nadia Vronskaïa
 Jacques Dumesnil as 	Gilbert Odet
 Jacques Morel as 	Pilou
 Maurice Teynac as 	Labaroche
 Jeanne Fusier-Gir as 	Tante Amélie
 Micheline Dax as 	La brune remplaçante
 Jean Nergal as 	Van Roosebeck
 Jean Lefebvre as 	Edouard, le fils d'Amélie
 Philippe Olive as 	Marquis d'Elgoïbar
 Max Montavon as 	Le garçon d'étage de Paris
 Henri Virlojeux as 	Le garçon d'étage de province
 Paul Bisciglia as 	Le chasseur
 Bernard Musson as Le réceptionniste de l'hôtel
 Paul Faivre as Gabriel, le jardinier de Gilbert
 Jackie Sardou as 	Hélène, la domestique de Gilbert

References

Bibliography 
Krawc, Alfred. International Directory of Cinematographers, Set- and Costume Designers in Film: France (from the beginnings to 1980). Saur, 1983.

External links 
 

1957 films
French comedy films
1957 comedy films
1950s French-language films
Films directed by Raymond Bernard
1950s French films